The 34th Independent Motor Rifle Brigade (Mountain) (34 Omsbr(g)), Military Unit Number 01485, is a mountain warfare formation of the Russian Ground Forces. It is part of the 49th Combined Arms Army, Southern Military District. It is stationed in the village of Storozhevaya-2, Zelenchuksky District, Karachay-Cherkessia. It was created on June 30 2006. It belongs to the Mountain Troops, whose task is to fight in mountainous areas. In 2014, it was reported that the brigade trained military mountaineers and had pack units on horses of local breeds.

The brigade took part in the 2022 Russian invasion of Ukraine. It was present in Ukraine by April 2022. As part of Armed Forces of Ukraine offensive operations in the Kherson area in late July 2022, its headquarters was destroyed by forces of the Ukrainian Operational Command South.

Organization 
The brigade includes the following units:

 Brigade Headquarters
 1001st Separate Motor Rifle Battalion (Mountain)
 1021st Separate Motor Rifle Battalion (Mountain)
 1199th Separate Motor Rifle Battalion (Mountain)
 491st Separate Howitzer Self-Propelled Artillery Battalion
 Signals Battalion
 Anti-Aircraft Missile and Artillery Battalion
 Electronic-Warfare Company
 Engineering-Sapper Company
 Repair Company
 Logistics Company
 Medical Company

References 

Mechanised infantry brigades of Russia
Military units and formations established in 2006